The Botswana Wildlife Training Institute (est. 1984) is a government funded educational facility in Botswana. It is located adjacent to the Maun Wildlife Educational Park, on the Thamalakane River near Maun in the North-West District.

It operates under the Botswana Department of Wildlife & National Parks (DWNP), and the Botswana Ministry of Environment, Wildlife & Tourism.

Programs
It has programs for: wildlife management and wildlife conservation, professional tour guide certification, and Japanese language training.

 Certificate in Wildlife Management — 1 year program.
 Diploma in Wildlife Management — 2 year program.
 Professional Guides programme — 19 weeks.
 Japanese language course — 10 weeks.

Short courses
Short continuing education courses include:
  Customer Service (2 weeks)
 Fire Management (1 week) 
 First Aid (2 weeks) 
 Radio Communication (2 weeks) 
 Problem Animal Control (6 weeks) 
 Induction and Basic Training (11 weeks) 
 Leadership Skills Enhancement Course (8 weeks) 
 Professional Guide Course (6 weeks)

The training institute celebrated its 25th anniversary in 2009 with a graduation ceremony for 70 students.

References

External links
 Facebook: BWTI−Botswana Wildlife Training Institute page

Schools in Botswana
Nature conservation in Botswana
Environmental organisations based in Botswana
North-West District (Botswana)
Tourism in Botswana
Educational institutions established in 1984
Environmental organizations established in 1984
1984 establishments in Botswana